Hyphydrus is a genus of diving beetle native to the Palearctic (including Europe), the Afro-tropical region, the Near East, North Africa. It contains the following species:

 Hyphydrus abyssinicus Peschet, 1916
 Hyphydrus aequatorialis Biström, 1983
 Hyphydrus agnitus Guignot, 1952
 Hyphydrus alfredi Bilardo & Rocchi, 1986
 Hyphydrus alluaudi Régimbart, 1889
 Hyphydrus amplimaculatus Bilardo & Rocchi, 1995
 Hyphydrus anatolicus Guignot, 1957
 Hyphydrus assinicus Régimbart, 1889
 Hyphydrus ater Bilardo, 1982
 Hyphydrus aubei Ganglbauer, 1891
 Hyphydrus barysomus Guignot, 1959
 Hyphydrus bigamus Guignot, 1956
 Hyphydrus birmanicus Régimbart, 1888
 Hyphydrus bistrimaculatus Biström, Hendrich & Kirk-Spriggs, 1997
 Hyphydrus bistroemi Bilardo & Rocchi, 1986
 Hyphydrus boettcheri Biström, 1982
 Hyphydrus brancuccii Biström, 1981
 Hyphydrus burgeoni Gschwendtner, 1930
 Hyphydrus caffer Boheman, 1848
 Hyphydrus camerunensis Biström, 1982
 Hyphydrus caryerus Guignot, 1942
 Hyphydrus celebensis Biström, 1983
 Hyphydrus celox Biström, 1987
 Hyphydrus ceramensis Wewalka & Biström, 1993
 Hyphydrus circumflexus Klug, 1853
 Hyphydrus coccinelloides Zimmermann, 1923
 Hyphydrus concii Bilardo & Rocchi, 1986
 Hyphydrus congoanus Biström, 1982
 Hyphydrus conradsi Gschwendtner, 1933
 Hyphydrus contiguus Wehncke, 1877
 Hyphydrus cuppeni Biström, 1984
 Hyphydrus cycloides Régimbart, 1889
 Hyphydrus dani Biström, Balke & Hendrich, 1993
 Hyphydrus decemmaculatus Wehncke, 1877
 Hyphydrus delibatus Guignot, 1947
 Hyphydrus detectus Falkenström, 1936
 Hyphydrus dissimilis Biström, 1983
 Hyphydrus distinctus Aubé, 1838
 Hyphydrus ditylus Guignot, 1953
 Hyphydrus dongba Stastný, 2000
 Hyphydrus eldenbecki Biström, 1982
 Hyphydrus elegans (Montrouzier, 1860)
 Hyphydrus eremita Guignot, 1954
 Hyphydrus esau Biström, 1982
 Hyphydrus essoni Bilardo & Rocchi, 1995
 Hyphydrus excoffieri Régimbart, 1899
 Hyphydrus facilis Biström, 1987
 Hyphydrus falkenstromi Gschwendtner, 1939
 Hyphydrus fangensis Biström & Satô, 1988
 Hyphydrus flaviceps Zimmermann, 1926
 Hyphydrus fluviatilis Pederzani, 1988
 Hyphydrus funebris Guignot, 1956
 Hyphydrus fuscus Omer-Cooper, 1931
 Hyphydrus gabonicus Régimbart, 1895
 Hyphydrus gibbosus Biström, 1984
 Hyphydrus grandis Laporte, 1835
 Hyphydrus gschwendtneri Guignot, 1942
 Hyphydrus holmeni Biström, 1983
 Hyphydrus holomelas Biström, 1984
 Hyphydrus humilis Bilardo & Rocchi, 1995
 Hyphydrus imitator Biström, 1984
 Hyphydrus impressus Klug, 1833
 Hyphydrus inopinatus Omer-Cooper, 1971
 Hyphydrus intermixtus (Walker, 1858)
 Hyphydrus jacobsoni Biström, 1982
 Hyphydrus jaechi Wewalka & Biström, 1989
 Hyphydrus japonicus Sharp, 1873
 Hyphydrus keiseri Mouchamps, 1959
 Hyphydrus komghaensis Omer-Cooper, 1965
 Hyphydrus laeviventris Sharp, 1882
 Hyphydrus lanzai Bilardo & Rocchi, 1986
 Hyphydrus lasiosternus Guignot, 1942
 Hyphydrus lentiginosus Guignot, 1935
 Hyphydrus linnavuorii Biström, 1982
 Hyphydrus loriae Régimbart, 1892
 Hyphydrus lyratus Swartz, 1808
 Hyphydrus maculatus Babington, 1841
 Hyphydrus maculiceps Régimbart, 1906
 Hyphydrus maculifer Guignot, 1959
 Hyphydrus madagascariensis Wehncke, 1877
 Hyphydrus malkini Guignot, 1959
 Hyphydrus mbandouensis Bilardo & Rocchi, 1990
 Hyphydrus megas Biström, 2000
 Hyphydrus microreticulatus Bilardo & Rocchi, 1986
 Hyphydrus nasutus Bilardo & Pederzani, 1978
 Hyphydrus nigrovittatus Régimbart, 1906
 Hyphydrus occultus Bilardo & Rocchi, 1995
 Hyphydrus odiosus Guignot, 1952
 Hyphydrus omercooperae Guéorguiev, 1975
 Hyphydrus opaculus Régimbart, 1895
 Hyphydrus orientalis Clark, 1863
 Hyphydrus ovatus (Linnaeus, 1761)
 Hyphydrus parvicollis Sharp, 1882
 Hyphydrus pavani Bilardo & Rocchi, 1986
 Hyphydrus pederzanii Biström, 1982
 Hyphydrus perforatus Régimbart, 1895
 Hyphydrus pictus Klug, 1834
 Hyphydrus prinzi Wewalka & Biström, 1989
 Hyphydrus prozeskyi Biström, 1982
 Hyphydrus pulchellus Clark, 1863
 Hyphydrus puncticollis Sharp, 1882
 Hyphydrus quadriguttatus Guignot, 1956
 Hyphydrus quadrisulcatus Bilardo & Rocchi, 1986
 Hyphydrus renardi Severin, 1890
 Hyphydrus residuus Omer-Cooper, 1971
 Hyphydrus sanctus Sharp, 1882
 Hyphydrus satyrus Bilardo & Pederzani, 1978
 Hyphydrus schoedli Wewalka & Biström, 1993
 Hyphydrus schoutedeni Gschwendtner, 1930
 Hyphydrus scriptus (Fabricius, 1798)
 Hyphydrus separandus Régimbart, 1895
 Hyphydrus signatus Sharp, 1882
 Hyphydrus silfverbergi Biström, 1982
 Hyphydrus silvanus Bilardo, 1982
 Hyphydrus sjoestedti Biström, 1982
 Hyphydrus solivagus Bilardo & Rocchi, 1999
 Hyphydrus soni Biström, 1982
 Hyphydrus spangleri Biström, 1985
 Hyphydrus sphaeroidalis Biström, 1982
 Hyphydrus stipator Guignot, 1942
 Hyphydrus stipes Sharp, 1882
 Hyphydrus subsignatus Bilardo & Rocchi, 1990
 Hyphydrus sumatrae Régimbart, 1880
 Hyphydrus sylvester Guignot, 1955
 Hyphydrus tristiculus Guignot, 1951
 Hyphydrus trophis Guignot, 1955
 Hyphydrus tuberosus Guignot, 1954
 Hyphydrus variolosus Régimbart, 1906
 Hyphydrus vassalloi Bilardo & Rocchi, 1990
 Hyphydrus villiersi Guignot, 1948
 Hyphydrus wittei Gschwendtner, 1938
 Hyphydrus zambiensis Pederzani, 1988

Gallery

References

External links

Hyphydrus at Fauna Europaea

Dytiscidae